Filter house may refer to:

 French house, a type of house music
 Filter House, a novel by Nisi Shawl